Mike Willemsen (born ), better  known by his stage name Mike Williams, is a Dutch DJ, record producer, musician, and remixer. He is best known for working with Tiësto and as an artist of Spinnin' Records, who recognised him as an "artist of the future". He is regarded as one of the pioneers of the future bounce genre, an emerging subgenre of future house, alongside Dutch DJs Justin Mylo, Brooks and Mesto.

Biography

Early life
Willemsen was born on November 27, 1996. He started playing the piano as a child at the age of 6. When he grew a little older, he learned sight-reading during his piano lessons but would rather devise, make and play his own songs. Afterwards, he quit his lessons and started working on a laptop with an amplifier and his father's speakers. At the age of 12, he learned to DJ and produced his first dance track. At 14, he performed as a DJ in a club for 500 people, and after that was regularly booked for gigs. He lives with his sister Michelle, a news reporter.

Music career
At the beginning of his career, he released numerous remixes and bootlegs of songs such as "Blame" by Calvin Harris and "I Really Like You" by Carly Rae Jepsen, which received over 3 million plays on SoundCloud. The remix of Harris's single was well received and was regularly played by other DJs such as Oliver Heldens at their sets. Later on, he started releasing his own songs, as well as collaborations with other artists and his first single was "Konnichiwa", which was released on January 31, 2015. On June 6, 2015, he released "Candy", a collaboration with Dastic (Damian Bast). Williams' single "Battlefield" under the alias WLLMS with Robby East was released on June 26, 2015. Since then, he was approached by labels and managements before signing with Spinnin' Records. He was signed by Tiësto, who later on also released a single with him, and was managed by MusicAllStars.

2016: Sweet & Sour 

On February 29, 2016, he released "Sweet & Sour", his first single through Tiësto's label Musical Freedom. The single peaked at number 6 on the Beatport Top 100 chart. An official music video for the song was released. On March 8, 2016, he was a guest and performed at Bij Igmar on SLAM!. During the Ultra Music Festival in 2016, Tiësto introduced Williams to the crowd and invited him to perform on his set. On May 16, 2016, Williams released "Groovy George", a collaboration with Justin Mylo through Musical Freedom. An official music video for the song was released. That same month, the two were guests and had performed at Bij Igmar on SLAM!. On August 5, 2016, together with Tiësto, he released "I Want You" through Musical Freedom as a free download. The single received over 16 million plays as of March 2017. That same month, he performed at the 2016 Mysteryland festival. In September, Williams remixed "Feel the Love", a single by Janieck, officially released on September 26. On October 17, 2016, he released "Take Me Down", his first single through Spinnin' Records. That same month, he performed at the Amsterdam Dance Event for the first time. His remix of "Money Maker" by Throttle featuring LunchMoney Lewis and Aston Merrygold came out on November 7, 2016.

2017–2018: Mike Williams on Track

On January 5, 2017, he started his own radio show titled "Mike Williams on Track", which is a part of the weekend schedule of Dutch radio station SLAM!. Four days later, he returned to Musical Freedom and released "Bambini", his first single of the year. On March 3, 2017, he released the single "Another Night" featuring Matluck on Spinnin' Records. An official music video for the song was also released. An acoustic version was released four weeks and five days later. On March 13, 2017, Williams announced on social media that his laptop has been stolen at Sunday night. While he was sleeping, a thief broke into his home in Amsterdam. He then woke up, but it was too late and he saw the thief running away with his laptop. The laptop had valuable data for him as a producer, prompting Williams to offer a $2000 reward to whoever helps him to get it back. On April 27, 2017, he performed at AFAS Stadion in Alkmaar during SLAM! Koningsdag 2017. On May 8, 2017, he released the single "Don't Hurt" on Spinnin' Records, which featured Brēzy. An official music video for the song was also released. That same month, he was a guest again and performed at Bij Igmar on SLAM!. Shortly afterwards, Williams released an official remix for "Hunter", a single by Galantis. A month later, he collaborated with Lucas & Steve and Curbi for the single "Let's Go". The four had then hosted an episode on the Spinnin' Records radio show Spinnin' Sessions. On August 4, 2017, he and Felix Jaehn released the collaborative single "Feel Good". Which was in the top 50 on the Apple Music dance charts, and spent a couple of weeks on the A-list dance playlist on Apple Music. A week later, he released "Step Up", a collaboration with Tom & Jame on the sub-label Spinnin' Copyright Free Music as a free download. On September 4, 2017, he released a single with Brooks, titled "Jetlag". On 26 January 2018 he released the single "Lullaby" with R3hab.

In the 2017 DJ Mag Top 100, Williams was voted in at number 60. In the 2018 DJ Mag Top 100, he was voted in at number 66. On November 5, 2021, Williams announced that he will be going on hiatus and stated that he felt "pressure & stress" in his career.

2022: Storylines
After his hiatus in 2021, Williams returned with his new album Storylines. He started 2022 with his new songs, "Pretty Little Words" with Zack Hall, "I Said Too Much" with Moa Lisa, "Here For You" with Magnificence, "Ambush" with Robbie Mendez, "Supernova" with Retrovision, "Best Part Missing", and "When The Sun Is Gone" with RYVM.

Discography

Charting singles

Singles

Remixes

Notes
 A  "Bambini" did not enter the Ultratop 50, but peaked at number 9 on the Walloon Dance Bubbling Under chart.
 B  "Let's Go" did not enter the Ultratop 50, but peaked on the Flemish Ultratip chart.

References

External links
 

1996 births
Dutch dance musicians
Dutch house musicians
Dutch DJs
Dutch record producers
Living people
Spinnin' Records artists
Future house musicians
Remixers
Electronic dance music DJs